Giuseppe Schiraldi is a Canadian former international soccer player.

Career 
Schiraldi played with Toronto City in 1971. In 1972, he played in the National Soccer League with Hamilton Italo-Canadians. The following season he played in the North American Soccer League with the Toronto Metros for two seasons. He returned to play in the National Soccer League in 1975 with Hamilton Italo-Canadians. He also played at the college level with the University of Akron in 1971.

International career 
He made his debut for the Canada men's national under-23 soccer team on May 30, 1971 against Bermuda. He also represented Canada in the 1971 Pan American Games. He made his debut for the senior team on August 20, 1972 against the United States in a FIFA World Cup qualifier match and later featured in seven matches.

Managerial career 
Since retiring, Joe has been active as a youth soccer coach and camp instructor in Ontario. In July 2006, he was appointed York Region Soccer Association Regional U12 Player Development Coach. He became a teacher at Brother Edmund rice catholic secondary school in toronto for many years and then moved to Don Bosco secondary catholic school, where he taught Physical education. He used to teach at Bryst Academy as the U12 coach. He now is the coach of the SSE90 boys U14 team (2019)

References

External links

1951 births
Living people
People from Sannicandro di Bari
Canada men's international soccer players
Canadian soccer players
Footballers at the 1971 Pan American Games
Pan American Games competitors for Canada
Association football midfielders
People from the Regional Municipality of York
Soccer people from Ontario
Toronto Blizzard (1971–1984) players
North American Soccer League (1968–1984) players
Canadian people of Italian descent
Canadian National Soccer League players
Italian emigrants to Canada
Sportspeople from the Metropolitan City of Bari
Footballers from Apulia